Halmosi is a surname. Notable people with the surname include:

Dominik Halmoši (born 1987), Czech ice hockey player
Péter Halmosi (born 1979), Hungarian footballer

Hungarian-language surnames